The 2010–11 Ligue Magnus season was the 90th season of the Ligue Magnus, the top level of ice hockey in France. 14 teams participated in the league, and Dragons de Rouen won their 11th league title.

Regular season

Playoffs

First round
Gothiques d'Amiens - Ducs de Dijon 2:0 (4:3 P, 3:2)
Dauphins d'Épinal - Étoile noire de Strasbourg 1:2 (1:4, 3:2, 0:2)
Brûleurs de Loups de Grenoble - Ours de Villard-de-Lans 0:2 (3:4 P, 2:4)
Chamois de Chamonix - Pingouins de Morzine 1:2 (4:1, 1:2 SN, 3:4)

Quarterfinals
Dragons de Rouen - Pingouins de Morzine 3:0 (6:2, 4:1, 6:1)
Ducs d'Angers - Ours de Villard-de-Lans 3:0 (8:0, 10:1, 7:5)
Rapaces de Gap - Étoile noire de Strasbourg 2:3 (2:1, 4:3 SN, 2:9, 2:3 OT, 4:6)
Diables Rouges de Briançon - Gothiques d'Amiens 1:3 (5:3, 4:5, 1:5, 2:3)

Semifinals
Dragons de Rouen - Gothiques d'Amiens 3:0 (3:1, 2:1, 9:8 SN)
Ducs d'Angers - Étoile noire de Strasbourg 1:3 (1:2 OT, 6:1, 1:2 SN, 1:3)

Final
Dragons de Rouen - Étoile noire de Strasbourg 3:0 (5:1, 5:3, 4:2)

Relegation
Drakkars de Caen - Avalanche Mont-Blanc 3:1 (3:2 OT, 1:2, 4:3, 2:1)

External links
 Season on hockeyarchives.info

1
Fra
Ligue Magnus seasons